Mumtaz Ali  (15 March 1905 – 6 May 1974) was an Indian dancer and character actor in Hindi cinema from the 1940s to 1970s. He was the father of Indian actor Mehmood. He also had his own dance troupe "Mumtaz Ali Nites" which performed all over India. His career slumped due to his excessive drinking and his family fell into hard times, leading to his son Mehmood to work as a child artist and daughter Minoo Mumtaz to work as dancer in his stage shows and later in movies.

Early life 
Mumtaz Ali was born in Madras in 1905. Orphaned very early, he was raised by his nine-year-old sister Karimunnisa. Around 1928, he lived on the streets in Bombay when he met Benjamin Guy Horniman, an Englishman amateur of Indian cinema and former publisher of the Bombay Chronicle. B G Horniman took him in, invited him to his home and supported him financially. Mumtaz Ali founded at that time a small troupe of street theater, the Mumtaz Ali Theatrical Company, for which he plays almost all roles. In 1933, BG Horniman recommended Mumtaz Ali to Himanshu Rai who was establishing the Bombay Talkies studio in Malad, the suburbs of Bombay.

Career
Mumtaz Ali joined Bombay Talkies from the first movie of the studio. He was a part of the production team of Jawani Ki Hawa which was released in 1935. But he had to wait the next year to appear on the screen on the third film, Achhut Kanya. Among his best work was his song "Mein to Dilli se Dulhan laya re" from the 1942 film Jhula. This song was a must to be played at all marriage functions in those days in Mumbai and India. Mumtaz Ali sided with Devika Rani during the Bombay Talkies split in early 1943. He decided to leave the studio in 1945, when Devika Rani left him.

After years
He was last seen in the 1974 Hindi movie Kunwara Baap, directed by and starring his son Mehmood in the song "Saj Rahi Gali Meri Maa". He died the same year on 6 May, aged 69.

Personal life 
Mumtaz Ali married Latifunnisa, in October 1929. They had eight children: Husseini, Mehmood, Khairunnisa, Usman, Malikunnisa ( Minoo Mumtaz ), Zubeida, Shaukat and Anwar. Mehmood made his acting debut in Kismet (1943). Minoo Mumtaz made her stage debut for Mumtaz Ali Nites and became a recognized dancer in Indian cinema in the 1950s.

Filmography

See also 
 Mehmood Ali Family
 Minoo Mumtaz
 Mehmood Ali
 Anwar Ali
 Lucky Ali
 List of Hindi film clans

Gallery

References

Some links
 
 jhula..mai tau dilli se dulhan laya re.1942 se  Mumtaz Ali & actress Shahzadi.

Male actors from Mumbai
Male actors in Hindi cinema
20th-century Indian male actors
1905 births
1974 deaths